The Tata Nano was a compact city car manufactured and marketed by Indian automaker Tata Motors over a single generation, primarily in India, as an inexpensive rear-engined hatchback intended to appeal to current riders of motorcycles and scooters — with a launch price of  or  on 10 January 2008.

Tata Motors projected production figures of 250,000 annually at launch. This was not achieved, and various factors led to decline in sales volume, including delays during the factory relocation from Singur to Sanand, early instances of the Nano catching fire or the perception of the car being unsafe and lacking quality due to cost cutting. Actual sales reached 7,591 for model year 2016-2017. The project lost money, as confirmed by former Tata Sons chairman Cyrus Mistry and by 2017 Tata Motors management.

In 2017, Tata Motors said manufacturing would continue due to the company's emotional commitment to the project. Production was eventually halted in May 2018. The Sanand Plant now produces other hatchbacks like Tiago and Tigor.

History
After successfully launching the low cost Tata Ace truck in 2005, Tata Motors began development of an affordable passenger car that would appeal to the many Indians who ride motorcycles. The purchase price of this no frills auto was brought down by dispensing with most nonessential features, reducing the amount of steel used in its construction, and relying on low cost Indian labour.. This led to reductions like the passenger's side wing mirror, one wiper blade, only three lug nuts per wheel or removal of the fuel filler cap from the tank. Tata said it was the first time a 2-cylinder petrol engine was being used in a car with single balancer shaft.

At introduction the Nano received much media attention due to its low price of 1 lakh rupees (Rs. 100,000).  Some promotional material labeled the vehicle as "The People’s Car".

Expectations and effects
Expectations created for the car during the run up to its production were commented as being out of proportion with realised sales. A 2008 study by Indian rating agency CRISIL projected the Nano would expand the nation's car market by 65%, but, as of late 2012, news reports have detailed the underwhelming response of the Indian consumer to the offering; sales in the first two fiscal years after the car's unveiling remained steady at about 70,000 units. Tata intended to maintain a capacity to produce the car in much larger quantities, some 250,000 per year, should the need arise.

It was anticipated that its 2009 debut would greatly affect the used car market, and prices did drop 25–30% prior to the launch. Sales of the Nano's nearest competitor, the Maruti 800, fell by 20% immediately following the unveiling of the Nano. It is unknown if the Nano has had a lasting effect on the prices of and demand for close substitutes. In July 2012, Tata's Group chairman Ratan Tata, who retired in January 2014, said that the car had immense potential in the developing world while admitting that early opportunities were wasted due to initial problems. Due to the sales drops, only a single unit was produced in June 2018. The Sanand Plant now produces other hatchbacks like Tiago and Tigor.

Singur factory pullout

Tata Motors announced in 2006 that the Nano  would be manufactured in Singur, West Bengal. Local farmers soon began protesting the 'supposed' forced acquisition of their land the new factory entailed. Tata first delayed the Nano launch and later decided to build the car in a different state, Gujarat, instead.

Price

Announced as the most affordable production car in the world, Tata aimed for a price of one lakh rupees, or 100,000, which was approximately $1,334.48 US at the time. Only the very first customers were able to purchase the car at that price, and as of 2017, the price for the basic Nano starts around  215,000. Increasing material costs may be to blame for this rapid rise in price.

Compared to the Volkswagen Beetle it had a relatively low price, though still high in terms of the average salary of an Indian industrial worker or farmer. In 1990, a Beetle from Mexican factories was priced at $5,300, about $ in today's money. The Ford Model T's initial price was about $850, equivalent to $ today. The price of the Nano was only just higher than the corrected price of the Briggs & Stratton Flyer of the 1910s, with the Flyer costing US$125 ($1,767 in 2016), while the Flyer may today be classified as a  go-kart more than a car.

Cost-cutting features
The Nano's design implements many measures to reduce manufacturing costs. Comparison with the Maruti Alto 800, the Tata Nano's closest competitor:

Technical specifications
The Nano (2012) was a  car with a two-cylinder 624 cc engine mounted in the rear of the car. The car complied with Bharat Stage 4 Indian Emissions Standards, which are roughly equivalent to Euro 4.

The development of the Nano led to 31 design and 37 technology patents being filed.

Tata GenX Nano (2015–2018) 

In May 2015, to revive the model's sales, Tata Motors introduced a series of enhancements both inside and outside the car. The name was changed to GenX Nano to underline the changes, the range was offered in 21 different versions, among them a 5-speed automated manual transmission. Electric power steering, air conditioning, and Bluetooth radio were available on top models in addition to new colors and alloy wheels. The body was strengthened and the front and rear bumpers were changed, which slightly increased the length to 3,164 millimeters. The interior was also redesigned with new fabrics and improved soundproofing. The rear opening door and the 5-seat homologation were introduced. The engine remained the 2-cylinder  with 38 hp.

Alternative power plants
The Nano was driven by a petrol engine. Though several variants were proposed, none were put into production. An upscale version was shown at an auto show.

Compressed-air engine
Tata Motors signed an agreement in 2007 with a French firm, Motor Development International, to produce a compressed air car Nano.

Electric vehicle
Tata discussed the possibility of producing an electric version, and while it showcased an electric vehicle Nano at the 2010 Geneva Motor Show, no such car came onto the market.

A Norwegian electric car specialist, Miljøbil Grenland AS, was named as a proposed partner in the project.

Tata Nano CNG emax (Bi-fuel)
The Nano CNG emax was launched in October 2013. It could run on either gasoline or compressed natural gas. Initially, it was to be sold in Delhi and parts of Maharashtra and Lucknow, where CNG was available at fuel outlets. The bifuel engine was powered by both CNG and petrol. In natural gas operation, the engine delivered maximum power of 33 horsepower and 45 Nm of maximum torque. The tank had a capacity of 32 liters (8 US Gal/7 UK Gal) of CNG.

Tata Super Nano 
In December 2014, Coimbatore-based JA Motorsport presented a 230 hp 1.3-liter engined version of the Nano called the 'Super Nano' at the Autocar Performance Show. Featuring a full body kit, slick tyres, a bolt-on roll cage, and smoked head and tail lamps, the Super Nano featured carbon fibre components, Recaro seats, and steering-mounted paddle shifters.

European export

An upscale Nano concept car called Nano Europa was shown at the 2009 Geneva Motor Show. However, there was no progress towards producing or marketing this upscale specification.

Car fires
There were reports of several fire incidents involving the Nano. The company denied those were connected to the car's design or its parts and blamed "foreign electrical equipment" found on top of the exhaust system. The company offered to retrofit the exhaust and electrical systems but refused to recall the cars. Tata extended the warranty on the car, including those already sold, from 18 months to four years in early December 2010.

Reception
The Nano received a mixed reception from Indian consumers; reasons given included that it was still too expensive compared to a motorcycle, and the extended waiting time for delivery (a few months). Although it was identified as the most affordable car, a secondhand car that was more expensive when it was new gave more social status;  the Nano was considered a "poor man's" vehicle, turning some people away. The fires and other safety issues were also a concern.

Tata Motors ended FY16 selling 21,012 Nanos, up from 16,901 in FY15.

Crash safety
In 2014, Global NCAP crash-tested an Indian-market Tata Nano at the ADAC facility in Germany in its pilot round of 64km/h front offset deformable barrier crash tests for its Safer Cars for India project (similar to Latin NCAP 2013). They also crashed the Nano in the configuration for the UN's R94 test. Tata had made it public that a version of the Nano designed for export to Europe had passed R94, and they were also expecting a four star Euro NCAP result. In contrast, the Indian car failed the R94 test and scored zero stars for adult and child occupant protection in Global NCAP's tests. The Nano was not fitted with airbags, not even one for the driver, nor ABS. During the 64km/h NCAP test the passenger compartment not only became unstable but also showed extremely high levels of intrusion of the steering column and waist-level intrusion of the A-pillar, showing high risk of life-threatening injury to the driver's head, neck and chest and also indicating that less critical body regions like the knees, tibias and feet were unlikely to be recoverable. The Nano had only static two-point seatbelts for the rear seats and no child seat available for sale in India could pass the installation check, meaning that the Nano was unsuitable for safely transporting children. It achieved zero stars for child occupant protection, scoring no points across all areas of assessment.

Sales
At the time of launch Tata Motors planned to sell 250,000 units per year. The maximum sales ever achieved was 74,527 units during FY 2011-2012 and then sales declined rapidly year after year leading to a negligible market share of the car in the "A" segment. The product was expected to be phased out soon as dealers stopped placing orders.

FY 2009–2010 30,000 approx

FY 2010–2011 70,432

FY 2011–2012 74,527

FY 2012–2013 53,848

FY 2013–2014 21,129

FY 2014–2015 16,903

FY 2016-2017 7,591

FY 2017-2018 April - October 1,502

End of production 
Due to the low sales of the model (only one Nano was assembled in June 2018 against the 275 assembled in June 2017) Tata Motors announced the end of production without any direct successor. The Nano was never really appreciated by the public and sales were always lower than expected.
The Sanand Plant now produces other hatchbacks like Tiago and Tigor.

Awards
 2010 Business Standard Motoring Indian car of the year
 2010 Bloomberg UTV-Autocar car of the year
 2010 Edison Awards, first place in the transportation category
 2010 Good Design Awards, in the category of transportation
 2014 India's Most Trusted hatchback car, according to The Brand Trust Report 2014 edition

In the media
 Small Wonder: The Making of Nano–a book about the creation of the Tata Nano
 A Megafactories episode on this vehicle
 From Bollywood to Hollywood in Jay Leno's garage. YouTube channel.
 Das Billigste Auto der Welt - Tata Nano. YouTube channel.

See also
 Tata Pixel
 Singur Tata Nano controversy
 City car
 Tata Ace
 Tata Magic Iris
 Bajaj RE60
 Fiat 126
 Kei car

References

External links
 Tata Nano – Official product page

City cars
Rear-wheel-drive vehicles
Rear-engined vehicles
Nano
Cars introduced in 2008
Cars powered by 2-cylinder engines
2010s cars
Global NCAP superminis